Crêpes & Waffles is a Colombian restaurant chain. The idea was born from a couple of Los Andes university students project, who had the vision to open a business in which they believed. Crêpes & Waffles originally catered to the upper class, but within the past few years, the prices have decreased, making it more affordable than other similar restaurants. The combination of high quality and low-price meals was a factor leading to its commercial success.

History
Founded on April 13, 1980, two students of Los Andes university, opened their first restaurant in Bogotá, Colombia in the style of a small rustic French crêperie. The restaurant was so simple that even the menu was made of a piece of wood that contained the different types of crêpes, waffles and ice creams. 	
During the past few years the chain has been so successful that now it has restaurants in Spain & Peru, and many other countries. The last international restaurant that opened was inaugurated in São Paulo, Brazil. Also the chain stop selling franchises.

In Colombia it's also well known for only hiring single women and "women in need" because responsibility, and also does this in Quito.

A project to export Crêpes and Waffles to France, Italy, and Portugal has been halted for the time being.

Restaurants 

 : 84 Restaurants; 69 Ice Cream Shops
 Barranquilla 4 Restaurants; 3 Ice Cream Shops.
 Bogotá 43 Restaurants; 43 Ice Cream Shops.
 Bucaramanga 3 Restaurants; 3 Ice Cream Shops.
 Cali 8 Restaurants; 5 Ice Cream Shops.
 Cartagena 5 Restaurants; 4 Ice Cream Shops.
 Manizales 1 Restaurant
 Medellín 17 Restaurants; 9 Ice Cream Shops.
 Mosquera 1 Ice Cream Shop,
 Pereira 2 Restaurants; 1 Ice Cream Shop.
 Santa Marta 3 Restaurants; 1 Ice Cream Shop.
 Villavicencio 1 Restaurant.
 Cúcuta 1 Restaurant; 1 Ice Cream Shop. (Project)
 Montería 1 Restaurant (Project)
 : 3 Restaurants (Santiago de Chile)
 : 5 Restaurants; 5 Ice Cream Shops. (Quito)
 : 4 Restaurants (Madrid)
 : 7 Restaurants
 Ciudad de México 6 restaurants.
 Naucalpan 1 restaurant.
 : 4 Restaurants (Panamá)
 : 4 Restaurants; 1 Ice Cream Shop
 : 1 Restaurant (Caracas)
 : 1 Restaurant (São Paulo)

References

External links
 

Colombian cuisine
Restaurant chains in Colombia